Recoropha is a genus of moths of the family Noctuidae.

Species
 Recoropha canteneri (Duponchel, 1833)

References
Natural History Museum Lepidoptera genus database
Recoropha at funet

Cuculliinae